KVNC may refer to:

 Venice Municipal Airport (ICAO code KVNC)
 KVNC (FM), a radio station (90.9 FM) licensed to serve Minturn, Colorado, United States
 KVNC, a defunct radio station in Winslow, Arizona